Geidar is a possible transliteration for:

Haydar, an Arabic name (Arabic حيدر )
Heydar, an Azerbaijani given name (Azerbaijani Heydər, Гейдар)